Top of the Pops 40th Anniversary 1964–2004 DVD is a 2004 music DVD released in the United Kingdom. It features one song for each year to celebrate the 40th Anniversary of the BBC's long-running music programme, Top of the Pops.

Tracks included on this DVD
1964: Billy J. Kramer & The Dakotas – Little Children
1965: Sandie Shaw – Long Live Love
1966: The Seekers – The Carnival Is Over (Performance was from 1965)
1967: Procol Harum – A Whiter Shade of Pale
1968: The Crazy World of Arthur Brown – Fire
1969: The Hollies – Sorry Suzanne
1970: Free – All Right Now
1971: T.Rex – Get It On
1972: Roxy Music – Virginia Plain
1973: Slade – Cum on Feel the Noize
1974: The Three Degrees – When Will I See You Again
1975: Steve Harley & Cockney Rebel – Make Me Smile (Come Up and See Me)
1976: The Real Thing – You to Me Are Everything
1977: Queen – Good Old Fashioned Lover Boy
1978: The Jam – Down in the Tube Station at Midnight
1979: Ian Dury & The Blockheads – Hit Me With Your Rhythm Stick
1980: Adam and the Ants – Ant Music
1981: The Human League – Don't You Want Me
1982: Culture Club – Do You Really Want to Hurt Me?
1983: UB40 – Red Red Wine
1984: Wham! – Wake Me Up Before You Go-Go
1985: Eurythmics – There Must Be an Angel (Playing with My Heart)
1986: Pet Shop Boys – West End Girls
1987: Bee Gees – You Win Again
1988: Yazz and the Plastic Population – The Only Way Is Up
1989: Lisa Stansfield – All Around the World
1990: Sinéad O'Connor – Nothing Compares 2 U
1991: Seal – Crazy
1992: Stereo MCs – Connected
1993: New Order – Regret
1994: Blur – Parklife
1995: Take That – Back for Good
1996: Oasis – Don't Look Back in Anger
1997: Spice Girls – Wannabe
1998: Manic Street Preachers – If You Tolerate This Your Children Will Be Next
1999: Ricky Martin – Livin La Vida Loca
2000: Sophie Ellis-Bextor & Spiller – Groovejet (If This Ain't Love)
2001: Texas – I Don't Want a Lover
2002: Status Quo – Rockin' All Over The World
2003: The Darkness – I Believe in a Thing Called Love
2004: Michael Andrews featuring Gary Jules – Mad World

Top of the Pops
2004 video albums
Live video albums
2004 live albums